The QSI International School of Brindisi is an international school founded in 2005 in Brindisi, Italy. It offers classes from age 3 (preschool) to age 18 (secondary/high school). The main subjects are Mathematics, Science, Reading, Writing, Cultural Studies (History) and Literature (secondary). Many other classes such as Physical Education (PE), Art, Technology, Study Skills, and Italian Language are available.

Its campus is a former Italian preschool.

References

External links

 QSI International School of Brindisi

International schools in Italy
Brindisi
2005 establishments in Italy
Educational institutions established in 2005
Quality Schools International